Katkola railway station is a  railway station on the Western Railway network in the state of Gujarat, India. Katkola railway station is 40 km far away from Porbandar railway station. Passenger trains halt here.

References

See also
 Jamnagar district

Railway stations in Jamnagar district
Bhavnagar railway division